Funen Art Academy is an independent, nationally recognized educational institution located in central Odense, Denmark offering a 5-year programme in contemporary visual arts.

The academy is funded jointly by the Danish Ministry of Culture, the municipality of Odense, and private foundations and sponsors.

See also
Jutland Art Academy

References

Odense
Art schools in Denmark